The 2007 AFL season was the 111th season of the Australian Football League (AFL), the highest level senior Australian rules football competition in Australia, which was known as the Victorian Football League until 1989. The season featured sixteen clubs, ran from 30 March until 29 September, and comprised a 22-game home-and-away season followed by a finals series featuring the top eight clubs.

The premiership was won by the Geelong Football Club for the seventh time, after it defeated  by a record 119 points in the AFL Grand Final.

Pre-season competition

Premiership season

Round 1

Round 2

Round 3

Round 4

Round 5

Round 6

Round 7

Round 8

Round 9

Round 10

Round 11

Round 12

Round 13

Round 14

Round 15

Round 16

Round 17

Round 18

Round 19

Round 20

Round 21

Round 22

Ladder

Win/loss table 
{| class="wikitable" style="font-size:85%; text-align:center; width:90%"
|- valign="top"
!valign="middle"| Team
! 1
! 2
! 3
! 4
! 5
! 6
! 7
! 8
! 9
! 10
! 11
! 12
! 13
! 14
! 15
! 16
! 17
! 18
! 19
! 20
! 21
! 22
! F1
! F2
! F3
! GF
!valign="middle"| Ladder
|-
| align="left"| 
| style="background:#FFCFCF;"|Ess-31
| style="background:#cfc;"|WB+38
| style="background:#cfc;"|PA+24
| style="background:#cfc;"|Syd+17
| style="background:#FFCFCF;"|Frem-1
| style="background:#FFCFCF;"|Coll-24
| style="background:#cfc;"|BL+31
| style="background:#cfc;"|Rich+9
| style="background:#cfc;"|Carl+19
| style="background:#FFCFCF;"|Melb-17
| style="background:#FFCFCF;"|Geel-7
| style="background:#cfc;"|Kang+46
| style="background:#FFCFCF;"|WCE-21
| style="background:#cfc;"|Haw+71
| style="background:#FFCFCF;"|StK-2
| style="background:#FFCFCF;"|Frem-25
| style="background:#FFCFCF;"|Ess-12
| style="background:#cfc;"|PA+8
| style="background:#FFCFCF;"|Geel-33
| style="background:#cfc;"|WB+34
| style="background:#cfc;"|BL+26
| style="background:#cfc;"|Coll+19
| style="background:#FFCFCF;"|Haw-3
| X
| X
| X
| 8 (8)
|-
| align="left"| 
| style="background:#cfc;"|Haw+25
| style="background:#cfc;"|StK+52
| style="background:#FFCFCF;"|Syd-27
| style="background:#FFCFCF;"|Kang-24
| style="background:#cfc;"|Carl+12
| style="background:#cfc;"|Frem+45
| style="background:#FFCFCF;"|Adel-31
| style="background:#FFCFCF;"|Ess-64
| style="background:#FFCFCF;"|Coll-33
| style="background:#ccf;"|Rich0
| style="background:#FFCFCF;"|WB-23
| style="background:#FFCFCF;"|Geel-50
| style="background:#FFCFCF;"|PA-7
| style="background:#cfc;"|WCE+27
| style="background:#cfc;"|Melb+44
| style="background:#cfc;"|Carl+117
| style="background:#cfc;"|Coll+93
| style="background:#cfc;"|Kang+37
| style="background:#FFCFCF;"|Haw-24
| style="background:#ccf;"|Syd0
| style="background:#FFCFCF;"|Adel-26
| style="background:#FFCFCF;"|Geel-42
| X
| X
| X
| X
| 10
|-
| align="left"| 
| style="background:#cfc;"|Rich+17
| style="background:#FFCFCF;"|Geel-78
| style="background:#cfc;"|Ess+3
| style="background:#FFCFCF;"|WCE-61
| style="background:#FFCFCF;"|BL-12
| style="background:#FFCFCF;"|StK-43
| style="background:#FFCFCF;"|Coll-24
| style="background:#FFCFCF;"|Kang-17
| style="background:#FFCFCF;"|Adel-19
| style="background:#cfc;"|WB+10
| style="background:#cfc;"|PA+39
| style="background:#FFCFCF;"|Haw-100
| style="background:#FFCFCF;"|Frem-77
| style="background:#FFCFCF;"|Melb-23
| style="background:#FFCFCF;"|Syd-62
| style="background:#FFCFCF;"|BL-117
| style="background:#FFCFCF;"|StK-10
| style="background:#FFCFCF;"|Coll-24
| style="background:#FFCFCF;"|PA-23
| style="background:#FFCFCF;"|Ess-10
| style="background:#FFCFCF;"|Kang-82
| style="background:#FFCFCF;"|Melb-31
| X
| X
| X
| X
| 15
|-
| align="left"| 
| style="background:#cfc;"|Kang+3
| style="background:#FFCFCF;"|WCE-12
| style="background:#cfc;"|Rich+25
| style="background:#FFCFCF;"|PA-18
| style="background:#cfc;"|Ess+16
| style="background:#cfc;"|Adel+24
| style="background:#cfc;"|Carl+24
| style="background:#FFCFCF;"|WB-33
| style="background:#cfc;"|BL+33
| style="background:#cfc;"|Frem+9
| style="background:#FFCFCF;"|Melb-13
| style="background:#cfc;"|Syd+19
| style="background:#FFCFCF;"|Haw-8
| style="background:#cfc;"|StK+9
| style="background:#FFCFCF;"|Geel-16
| style="background:#cfc;"|Ess+29
| style="background:#FFCFCF;"|BL-93
| style="background:#cfc;"|Carl+24
| style="background:#FFCFCF;"|Rich-20
| style="background:#cfc;"|Melb+11
| style="background:#cfc;"|Syd+25
| style="background:#FFCFCF;"|Adel-19
| style="background:#cfc;"|Syd+38
| style="background:#cfc;"|WCE+19
| style="background:#FFCFCF;"|Geel-5
| X
| 6 (4)
|-
| align="left"| 
| style="background:#cfc;"|Adel+31
| style="background:#cfc;"|Frem+10
| style="background:#FFCFCF;"|Carl-3
| style="background:#cfc;"|StK+31
| style="background:#FFCFCF;"|Coll-16
| style="background:#FFCFCF;"|Haw-35
| style="background:#FFCFCF;"|Kang-22
| style="background:#cfc;"|BL+64
| style="background:#cfc;"|Rich+8
| style="background:#cfc;"|Syd+1
| style="background:#cfc;"|WCE+1
| style="background:#FFCFCF;"|PA-31
| style="background:#cfc;"|Melb+2
| style="background:#FFCFCF;"|Geel-50
| style="background:#FFCFCF;"|WB-33
| style="background:#FFCFCF;"|Coll-29
| style="background:#cfc;"|Adel+12
| style="background:#FFCFCF;"|Haw-63
| style="background:#FFCFCF;"|Frem-63
| style="background:#cfc;"|Carl+10
| style="background:#FFCFCF;"|Rich-27
| style="background:#FFCFCF;"|WCE-8
| X
| X
| X
| X
| 12
|-
| align="left"| 
| style="background:#FFCFCF;"|PA-16
| style="background:#FFCFCF;"|Ess-10
| style="background:#FFCFCF;"|WCE-31
| style="background:#cfc;"|Melb+45
| style="background:#cfc;"|Adel+1
| style="background:#FFCFCF;"|BL-45
| style="background:#cfc;"|Haw+16
| style="background:#FFCFCF;"|Geel-25
| style="background:#cfc;"|StK+46
| style="background:#FFCFCF;"|Coll-9
| style="background:#cfc;"|Rich+21
| style="background:#FFCFCF;"|WB-26
| style="background:#cfc;"|Carl+77
| style="background:#FFCFCF;"|Syd-28
| style="background:#FFCFCF;"|Kang-4
| style="background:#cfc;"|Adel+25
| style="background:#FFCFCF;"|Geel-68
| style="background:#cfc;"|WCE+27
| style="background:#cfc;"|Ess+63
| style="background:#FFCFCF;"|StK-30
| style="background:#cfc;"|Melb+59
| style="background:#FFCFCF;"|PA-32
| X
| X
| X
| X
| 11
|-
| align="left"| 
| style="background:#FFCFCF;"|WB-20
| style="background:#cfc;"|Carl+78
| style="background:#cfc;"|Melb+52
| style="background:#FFCFCF;"|Haw-4
| style="background:#FFCFCF;"|Kang-16
| style="background:#cfc;"|Rich+157
| style="background:#cfc;"|WCE+39
| style="background:#cfc;"|Frem+25
| style="background:#cfc;"|PA+56
| style="background:#cfc;"|StK+60
| style="background:#cfc;"|Adel+7
| style="background:#cfc;"|BL+50
| style="background:#cfc;"|Syd+18
| style="background:#cfc;"|Ess+50
| style="background:#cfc;"|Coll+16
| style="background:#cfc;"|WB+75
| style="background:#cfc;"|Frem+68
| style="background:#cfc;"|Rich+70
| style="background:#cfc;"|Adel+33
| style="background:#cfc;"|Kang+27
| style="background:#FFCFCF;"|PA-5
| style="background:#cfc;"|BL+42
| style="background:#cfc;"|Kang+106
| X
| style="background:#cfc;"|Coll+5
| style="background:#cfc;"|PA+119
| 1 (1)
|-
| align="left"| 
| style="background:#FFCFCF;"|BL-25
| style="background:#cfc;"|Melb+22
| style="background:#cfc;"|Kang+21
| style="background:#cfc;"|Geel+4
| style="background:#FFCFCF;"|WB-17
| style="background:#cfc;"|Ess+35
| style="background:#FFCFCF;"|Frem-16
| style="background:#cfc;"|StK+28
| style="background:#cfc;"|WCE+35
| style="background:#cfc;"|PA+34
| style="background:#FFCFCF;"|Syd-9
| style="background:#cfc;"|Carl+100
| style="background:#cfc;"|Coll+8
| style="background:#FFCFCF;"|Adel-71
| style="background:#cfc;"|Rich+53
| style="background:#FFCFCF;"|StK-17
| style="background:#FFCFCF;"|Kang-37
| style="background:#cfc;"|Ess+63
| style="background:#cfc;"|BL+24
| style="background:#FFCFCF;"|PA-5
| style="background:#cfc;"|WB+84
| style="background:#FFCFCF;"|Syd-72
| style="background:#cfc;"|Adel+3
| style="background:#FFCFCF;"|Kang-33
| X
| X
| 5 (6)
|-
| align="left"| 
| style="background:#FFCFCF;"|Coll-3
| style="background:#FFCFCF;"|PA-18
| style="background:#FFCFCF;"|Haw-21
| style="background:#cfc;"|BL+24
| style="background:#cfc;"|Geel+16
| style="background:#cfc;"|Syd+16
| style="background:#cfc;"|Ess+22
| style="background:#cfc;"|Carl+17
| style="background:#cfc;"|Melb+1
| style="background:#FFCFCF;"|WCE-66
| style="background:#cfc;"|StK+22
| style="background:#FFCFCF;"|Adel-46
| style="background:#cfc;"|WB+26
| style="background:#cfc;"|Rich+25
| style="background:#cfc;"|Frem+4
| style="background:#cfc;"|Melb+64
| style="background:#cfc;"|Haw+37
| style="background:#FFCFCF;"|BL-37
| style="background:#FFCFCF;"|WCE-17
| style="background:#FFCFCF;"|Geel-27
| style="background:#cfc;"|Carl+82
| style="background:#cfc;"|WB+64
| style="background:#FFCFCF;"|Geel-106
| style="background:#cfc;"|Haw+33
| style="background:#FFCFCF;"|PA-87
| X
| 4 (3)
|-
| align="left"| 
| style="background:#FFCFCF;"|StK-31
| style="background:#FFCFCF;"|Haw-22
| style="background:#FFCFCF;"|Geel-52
| style="background:#FFCFCF;"|Frem-45
| style="background:#FFCFCF;"|Syd-49
| style="background:#FFCFCF;"|PA-5
| style="background:#FFCFCF;"|WB-6
| style="background:#FFCFCF;"|WCE-77
| style="background:#FFCFCF;"|Kang-1
| style="background:#cfc;"|Adel+17
| style="background:#cfc;"|Coll+13
| style="background:#FFCFCF;"|Rich-49
| style="background:#FFCFCF;"|Ess-2
| style="background:#cfc;"|Carl+23
| style="background:#FFCFCF;"|BL-44
| style="background:#FFCFCF;"|Kang-64
| style="background:#FFCFCF;"|PA-89
| style="background:#FFCFCF;"|Syd-48
| style="background:#cfc;"|WB+42
| style="background:#FFCFCF;"|Coll-11
| style="background:#FFCFCF;"|Frem-59
| style="background:#cfc;"|Carl+31
| X
| X
| X
| X
| 14
|-
| align="left"| 
| style="background:#cfc;"|Frem+16
| style="background:#cfc;"|Kang+18
| style="background:#FFCFCF;"|Adel-24
| style="background:#cfc;"|Coll+18
| style="background:#cfc;"|StK+53
| style="background:#cfc;"|Melb+5
| style="background:#cfc;"|Rich+40
| style="background:#FFCFCF;"|Syd-31
| style="background:#FFCFCF;"|Geel-56
| style="background:#FFCFCF;"|Haw-34
| style="background:#FFCFCF;"|Carl-39
| style="background:#cfc;"|Ess+31
| style="background:#cfc;"|BL+7
| style="background:#FFCFCF;"|WB-20
| style="background:#cfc;"|WCE+91
| style="background:#cfc;"|Rich+55
| style="background:#cfc;"|Melb+89
| style="background:#FFCFCF;"|Adel-8
| style="background:#cfc;"|Carl+23
| style="background:#cfc;"|Haw+5
| style="background:#cfc;"|Geel+5
| style="background:#cfc;"|Frem+32
| style="background:#cfc;"|WCE+3
| X
| style="background:#cfc;"|Kang+87
| style="background:#FFCFCF;"|Geel-119
| 2 (2)
|-
| align="left"| 
| style="background:#FFCFCF;"|Carl-17
| style="background:#FFCFCF;"|Syd-16
| style="background:#FFCFCF;"|Coll-25
| style="background:#FFCFCF;"|WB-32
| style="background:#FFCFCF;"|WCE-23
| style="background:#FFCFCF;"|Geel-157
| style="background:#FFCFCF;"|PA-40
| style="background:#FFCFCF;"|Adel-9
| style="background:#FFCFCF;"|Ess-8
| style="background:#ccf;"|BL0
| style="background:#FFCFCF;"|Frem-21
| style="background:#cfc;"|Melb+49
| style="background:#FFCFCF;"|StK-17
| style="background:#FFCFCF;"|Kang-25
| style="background:#FFCFCF;"|Haw-53
| style="background:#FFCFCF;"|PA-55
| style="background:#FFCFCF;"|Syd-66
| style="background:#FFCFCF;"|Geel-70
| style="background:#cfc;"|Coll+20
| style="background:#FFCFCF;"|WCE-31
| style="background:#cfc;"|Ess+27
| style="background:#FFCFCF;"|StK-10
| X
| X
| X
| X
| 16
|-
| align="left"| 
| style="background:#cfc;"|Melb+31
| style="background:#FFCFCF;"|BL-52
| style="background:#cfc;"|WB+50
| style="background:#FFCFCF;"|Ess-31
| style="background:#FFCFCF;"|PA-53
| style="background:#cfc;"|Carl+43
| style="background:#cfc;"|Syd+26
| style="background:#FFCFCF;"|Haw-28
| style="background:#FFCFCF;"|Frem-46
| style="background:#FFCFCF;"|Geel-60
| style="background:#FFCFCF;"|Kang-22
| style="background:#cfc;"|WCE+23
| style="background:#cfc;"|Rich+17
| style="background:#FFCFCF;"|Coll-9
| style="background:#cfc;"|Adel+2
| style="background:#cfc;"|Haw+17
| style="background:#cfc;"|Carl+10
| style="background:#ccf;"|WB0
| style="background:#FFCFCF;"|Syd-17
| style="background:#cfc;"|Frem+30
| style="background:#FFCFCF;"|WCE-8
| style="background:#cfc;"|Rich+10
| X
| X
| X
| X
| 9
|-
| align="left"| 
| style="background:#FFCFCF;"|WCE-1
| style="background:#cfc;"|Rich+16
| style="background:#cfc;"|BL+27
| style="background:#FFCFCF;"|Adel-17
| style="background:#cfc;"|Melb+49
| style="background:#FFCFCF;"|Kang-16
| style="background:#FFCFCF;"|StK-26
| style="background:#cfc;"|PA+31
| style="background:#cfc;"|WB+43
| style="background:#FFCFCF;"|Ess-1
| style="background:#cfc;"|Haw+9
| style="background:#FFCFCF;"|Coll-19
| style="background:#FFCFCF;"|Geel-18
| style="background:#cfc;"|Frem+28
| style="background:#cfc;"|Carl+62
| style="background:#FFCFCF;"|WCE-12
| style="background:#cfc;"|Rich+66
| style="background:#cfc;"|Melb+48
| style="background:#cfc;"|StK+17
| style="background:#ccf;"|BL0
| style="background:#FFCFCF;"|Coll-25
| style="background:#cfc;"|Haw+72
| style="background:#FFCFCF;"|Coll-38
| X
| X
| X
| 7 (7)
|-
| align="left"| 
| style="background:#cfc;"|Syd+1
| style="background:#cfc;"|Coll+12
| style="background:#cfc;"|Frem+31
| style="background:#cfc;"|Carl+61
| style="background:#cfc;"|Rich+23
| style="background:#cfc;"|WB+15
| style="background:#FFCFCF;"|Geel-39
| style="background:#cfc;"|Melb+77
| style="background:#FFCFCF;"|Haw-35
| style="background:#cfc;"|Kang+66
| style="background:#FFCFCF;"|Ess-1
| style="background:#FFCFCF;"|StK-23| style="background:#cfc;"|Adel+21
| style="background:#FFCFCF;"|BL-27| style="background:#FFCFCF;"|PA-91
| style="background:#cfc;"|Syd+12| style="background:#cfc;"|WB+87
| style="background:#FFCFCF;"|Frem-27| style="background:#cfc;"|Kang+17
| style="background:#cfc;"|Rich+31| style="background:#cfc;"|StK+8
| style="background:#cfc;"|Ess+8| style="background:#FFCFCF;"|PA-3
| style="background:#FFCFCF;"|Coll-19| X
| X
| 3 (5)|-
| align="left"| 
| style="background:#cfc;"|Geel+20| style="background:#FFCFCF;"|Adel-38| style="background:#FFCFCF;"|StK-50
| style="background:#cfc;"|Rich+32
| style="background:#cfc;"|Haw+17
| style="background:#FFCFCF;"|WCE-15
| style="background:#cfc;"|Melb+6| style="background:#cfc;"|Coll+33| style="background:#FFCFCF;"|Syd-43| style="background:#FFCFCF;"|Carl-10
| style="background:#cfc;"|BL+23
| style="background:#cfc;"|Frem+26| style="background:#FFCFCF;"|Kang-26
| style="background:#cfc;"|PA+20| style="background:#cfc;"|Ess+33
| style="background:#FFCFCF;"|Geel-75
| style="background:#FFCFCF;"|WCE-87| style="background:#ccf;"|StK0| style="background:#FFCFCF;"|Melb-42
| style="background:#FFCFCF;"|Adel-34
| style="background:#FFCFCF;"|Haw-84| style="background:#FFCFCF;"|Kang-64| X
| X
| X
| X
| 13
|- valign="top"
!valign="middle"| Team
! 1
! 2
! 3
! 4
! 5
! 6
! 7
! 8
! 9
! 10
! 11
! 12
! 13
! 14
! 15
! 16
! 17
! 18
! 19
! 20
! 21
! 22
! F1
! F2
! F3
! GF
!valign="middle"| Ladder
|}

Bold – Home game
X – Bye
Opponent for round listed above margin

Ladder progression

Finals series

Week one

Week two

Week three

Week four

Awards

Best and fairests

 Adelaide: Andrew McLeod
 Brisbane: Jonathan Brown
 Carlton: Andrew Carrazzo
 Collingwood: Travis Cloke
 Essendon: James Hird
 Fremantle: Matthew Pavlich
 Geelong: Gary Ablett, Jr.
 Hawthorn: Brad Sewell

 Kangaroos: Brent Harvey
 Melbourne: James McDonald
 Port Adelaide: Kane Cornes
 Richmond: Matthew Richardson
 St Kilda: Nick Riewoldt
 Sydney: Brett Kirk
 West Coast: Darren Glass
 Western Bulldogs: Brian Harris

Notable events
 On Thursday 8 February it was announced that the Seven Network (who had not broadcast AFL for five years) and Ten Network had reached an agreement to on-sell four games per round to pay-TV provider Foxtel.
 In round 6,  scored 35.12 (222) against , which was at the time the highest score kicked in an AFL game since quarters were shortened from twenty-five to twenty minutes in 1994. It was also the first time a team has scored over 200 points since round 22, 1995. Their winning margin of 157 points also broke the record for the same period, and they scored an all-time record 23 more goals than behinds, and an all-time record three-quarter time score of 29.9 (183). This was also Richmond’s biggest loss in its 99-year VFL/AFL history and as of 2022 remains the biggest winning margin for any game at Docklands Stadium.
In the same game, Hawthorn kicked their highest ever score against Carlton: 27.18 (180), and also achieved their greatest winning margin against Carlton, 100 points.
 Robert Harvey became just the 10th player in VFL/AFL history to reach 350 games, helping  defeat . The win was the second time in 60 games that a Victorian team had beaten West Coast at Subiaco Oval.
He kicked 10.1 for the game. This surpassed Daniel Bradshaw's 9 goals in 2005 v  at the Gabba. After this match Denis Pagan was sacked as the coach of Carlton.
On 24 August, the Seven Network broadcast some details obtained from players' confidential medical records on its nightly news program relating to the use of non-performance-enhancing drugs. It allegedly purchased these details for $3000 from a woman who found them in a gutter outside a medical clinic in Melbourne. The name of the club involved, Hawthorn, was revealed by Seven on air, but before the end of the news program (at which time Seven had promised to actually reveal the names of the players), the AFL obtained a court injunction from the Supreme Court of Victoria which prevented this – and which continues to suppress the publication of any part of the records, including the name of the club. Because anonymity was guaranteed under the AFL's "three-strikes" drugs policy, the AFL players responded by boycotting the Seven Network, refusing to answer any questions posed by its journalists, including in matches broadcast by the network. Shortly after the completion of round 22, faced with the possibility of ongoing player boycotts – including of the Brownlow Medal count – the Seven Network issued a statement "regretting" any harm the broadcast may have caused to the AFL, the clubs and the players, and promised not to broadcast or reveal any of the details of the medical records in future. The AFL Players Association took the "statement of regret" as an apology and the boycott was lifted. The scandal came to be known as "Guttergate".
Under priority draft pick rules, this meant that whichever team won the game would lose a potential priority draft pick (which would have been the first overall selection if Carlton had it, or pick No. 18 if Melbourne had it). Melbourne won by five goals in a game noted for a lack of defensive pressure, while many in the crowd openly supported their teams to defeat.
This was only the second time that extra time has been used in an AFL game, and was also the second time that these teams had drawn in a final.
  set a new record for the highest winning margin in a grand final against , winning by 119 points.

Club leadership

Umpires

 Michael Avon
 Ray Chamberlain
 Chris Donlon
 Martin Ellis
 Luke Farmer
 Darren Goldspink
 Stefan Grun
 Matthew Head
 Craig Hendrie
 Scott Jeffery
 Chris Kamolins
 Hayden Kennedy
 Dean Margetts

 Stephen McBurney
 Shane McInerney
 Simon Meredith
 Kieron Nicholls
 Matthew Nicholls
 Troy Pannell
 Brett Rosebury
 Shaun Ryan
 Matt Stevic
 Damien Sully
 Michael Vozzo
 Stuart Wenn
 Derek Woodcock

Coach changes

See also
 2007 Australian football code crowds
 List of 2007 AFL debuts
 List of Australian Football League premiers

Notes

References

External links
 2007 Season – AFL Tables
 Official AFL website
 FOXSPORTS Australia AFL section
 Heraldsun site
 The Age Online 
 Sportal AFL
 2007 AFL season – Finalsiren.com
 CSV file of 2007 fixture for use with Microsoft Outlook calendars

Australian Football League seasons
AFL season